The Nuttiest Nutcracker is a 1999 computer-animated direct-to-video Christmas film loosely based on the 1892 ballet The Nutcracker. The film was directed by Harold Harris and starred the voices of Jim Belushi, Cheech Marin, and Phyllis Diller. This film follows a group of anthropomorphic fruits and vegetables. Their goal is to help the Nutcracker's army get a star to the top of a Christmas tree before midnight and stop a rodent army from destroying Christmas. The film was released on home video by Columbia TriStar Home Video in 1999. The film aired on CBS December 4, 1999, in addition to being shown on cable.

Plot
On a snowy Christmas Eve, Marie (Debi Derryberry) and her brother Fritz (Derryberry) are home alone with their Uncle Drosselmeyer (Jim Cummings). Marie and Fritz's parents are away for the night and Marie is dismayed at having to spend Christmas Eve without them. She then wishes for Christmas to go away forever.

A group of anthropomorphic nuts, Colonel (Jeff Bennett), Mac (Cheech Marin), Sparkle (Desirée Goyette), Stash (Kevin Schon), and Gramps (Cummings), overhear her plight, but become relieved at the scene of Uncle Drosselmeyer giving his niece and nephew Christmas gifts: a cannon for Fritz and a nutcracker doll for Marie. The nuts believe that the doll may be their prince (Cam Clarke) and proceed to tell Little Pea (Tress MacNeille), the youngest of the nuts, the story of how the nutcracker prince's relationship with a princess cursed by a mouse queen had turned him into a wooden figure, revealing that only true love will break the spell. Fritz takes the nutcracker from Marie. A chase up the ladder of the Christmas tree ensues, resulting in the doll falling hard to the floor. Upset by how "hurt" her nutcracker is, Marie turns Fritz away. She forgives her brother later in private, telling her nutcracker that out of all her gifts, she loves him the most. After kissing the doll on the lips, Marie becomes tired and falls asleep.

The nuts fall asleep as well, unaware of being targeted by the mouse queen's son, Reginald (Jim Belushi). He plans to steal the Christmas star on the top of the tree and take over the Christmas Kingdom. With his army of mice, he attempts to capture the nuts. The nuts fight toy soldiers, who prove no match against the mice. Mac stages a coup d'état with his own army of fruits and vegetables. The foods are eventually exhausted by fighting; Gramps is captured by three mice. Marie, awakened by the battle, sees her doll alive and fighting Reginald. Marie intervenes; Reginald is infatuated with her, but she brushes the mouse off her foot using the Christmas star. However, as the foods celebrate their victory, Marie is magically reduced to the nutcracker prince's height by Uncle Drosselmeyer.

The foods inform Marie that without the Christmas star, Christmas will be "gone forever". Fortunately, Marie still has the star. They head into the Sugar Plum Fairy's kingdom to seek help in getting the star back on the tree. Just as the entourage reaches the fairy's castle, Reginald shows up and captures Marie. Imprisoned in the cheese foundry of Reginald's palace, Marie laments her failure to save Christmas and imagines herself slow dancing with the prince in a chapel to emotional music. She is then summoned by Reginald, who offers to marry her. She refuses, but eventually sympathizes with the mouse king after learning that no one has given him a single Christmas gift.

The prince and the foods arrive at Reginald's palace, adamant on rescuing Marie and the others captured by Reginald's army. The foods are reluctant at first, but agree to sneak into the palace after noticing the prince's courage. Reginald and his sergeant perform a dance number. The prince is reunited with Marie. Chaos ensues when Reginald overhears a black-eyed pea laughing at him for not winning Marie's heart; a chase on flying motorcycles made of crackers and olives follows suit. In the middle of the chase, Reginald's palace starts to collapse. After the foods are rescued, Reginald falls into the cheese river due to his vehicle running out of fuel. Marie, having grown soft for the king, saves him and loses the star in the process. Reginald admits that it was "the first nice thing that anyone had ever done to [him]" before  producing the star to Marie.

The group arrives at the Sugar Plum Fairy's castle, where she reveals that the Christmas star is able to grant any wish including the power to bring Marie's parents home. After making her wish, Marie gently tosses the star to the ceiling and the screen fades to white. Marie wakes up to find her parents greeting her along with Uncle Drosselmeyer and a guest resembling the prince. The film  ends with Marie and the prince sharing a kiss while Mac and the nuts provide the mistletoe.

Voice cast
Debi Derryberry as Marie, the protagonist / Fritz, Marie's little brother
Cam Clarke as the Prince, a nutcracker / Asparagus / Mouse Sergeant
Jim Belushi as Reginald the Mouse King
Cheech Marin as Mac the Macadamia nut
Phyllis Diller as the Sugar Plum Fairy
Desirée Goyette as Sparkle, a humanoid nut in a blue dress
Tress MacNeille as Li'l Pea, a peanut child / Broccoli Floret, a broccoli in a tutu
Jeff Bennett as Colonel, a peanut / Mouse Doctor / Mouse Soldier / Toy Soldier
Jim Cummings as Uncle Drozzelmeyer / Gramps the Walnut
Kevin Schon as Stash, a cashew with a news reporter hat

Release

Critical reception 
The film has received mixed reviews, receiving a 40% audience on Rotten Tomatoes.

See also
 List of animated feature-length films
 List of Christmas films
 List of computer-animated films
 The Nutcracker

References

External links 
 
 

1999 computer-animated films
1999 direct-to-video films
1990s American animated films
1990s Christmas films
American direct-to-video films
American animated featurettes
Animated Christmas films
Canadian animated feature films
Canadian direct-to-video films
1999 directorial debut films
American Christmas films
Canadian Christmas films
Films based on The Nutcracker and the Mouse King
American independent films
Canadian independent films
Films about food and drink
Sony Pictures direct-to-video films
1999 films
1990s Canadian animated films
1990s English-language films
1990s Canadian films